Belgium competed at the 1932 Summer Olympics in Los Angeles, United States. 36 competitors, 29 men and 7 women, took part in 10 events in 2 sports.

Fencing

Seven fencers, six men and a woman, represented Austria in 1932.

Men's foil
 Georges de Bourguignon
 Werner Mund

Men's épée
 Balthazar De Beukelaer
 Max Janlet
 André Poplimont

Men's team épée
 André Poplimont, Max Janlet, Balthazar De Beukelaer, Werner Mund, Raoul Henkart

Men's sabre
 Georges de Bourguignon

Women's foil
 Jenny Addams

Art competitions

References

External links
Official Olympic Reports

Nations at the 1932 Summer Olympics
1932
Olympics